In Vanda's Room (Portuguese: No Quarto da Vanda, 2000) is a docufiction (a subgenre of cinéma vérité) film by Portuguese director Pedro Costa. This is the second film in his Fontainhas trilogy.

Overview 
The film follows the daily life of Vanda Duarte, a heroin addict, in the Fontainhas district, a shanty outskirt of Lisbon. The film's focus is also on the community of the district and its townscape. No Quarto da Vanda follows the drama film Ossos (1997) in which Vanda Duarte plays as an actress.

The film took a year to shoot after the (initially) one-person crew settled in the location, where Vanda and the community including Cape Verdean immigrants lived depressed lives.

In spite of its three-hour length, the director Pedro Costa made the film in a realist style by using fixed shots entirely. Melancholic life of the community was shot on digital video in a low-key way. Costa said about his impression of the district in a conversation with Jean-Pierre Gorin

When I entered the Fontainhas area, there were colors and smells that made me remember the things and events of the past, and also ideas about people to which I am attracted. These ideas nestled close to each other, living together even as they led very solitary lives because of violent and painful separation. A form of interesting and incompatible relationships existed in this.

The film also sees the Fontainhas district slowly being demolished. The displaced inhabitants are featured in Costa's next film Juventude em Marcha (Colossal Youth, 2006).

The Criterion Collection described the film as "burrow[ing] even deeper into the Lisbon ghetto and the lives of its desperate inhabitants... with the intimate feel of a documentary and the texture of a Vermeer painting" and praised its "unflinching, fragmentary look at a handful of self-destructive, marginalized people".

Cast
 Vanda Duarte as Self
 Lena Duarte as Self
 Zita Duarte as Self
 Pedro Lanban 
 António 'Pango' Semedo 
 Paulo Nunes 
 Paulo Jorge Gonçalves 
 Manuel Gomes Miranda 
 Evangelina Nelas 
 Fernando Paixão 
 Diogo Miranda

Credits 

 Director: Pedro Costa 
 Producer: Karl Baumgartner 
 Producer: Andres Pfäffli / Elda Guidinetti 
 Producer: Francisco Villa-Lobos 
 Cinematography: Pedro Costa 
 Editing: Dominique Auvray 
 Sound: Philippe Morel 
 Sound: Mathieu Imbert 
 Sound: Stephan Konken

Accolate
Despite its highly fictional nature, its elusive classification and its documentary-like hybridization allowed it to win the FIPRESCI Prize at the Yamagata International Documentary Film Festival in 2001 "for presenting life in its near-original form".

Pedro Costa collected the France Culture Award (Foreign Cineaste of the Year) for directing the film at 2002 Cannes Film Festival.

Home video 
This film, together with Ossos (1997) and Colossal Youth (2006), is released by the Criterion Collection in a box set Letters from Fontainhas: Three Films by Pedro Costa.

See also
 Ossos
 Juventude em Marcha
 Docufiction
 List of docufiction films
 Ethnofiction
 Cinéma vérité

References

External links
 
 
 
 Podcast with Pedro Costa (on the "Letters from Fontainhas" Criterion DVD set, 2010), GreenCine Daily
 Pedro Costa’s Fontainhas Trilogy: Rooms for the Living and the Dead an essay by Cyril Neyrat at the Criterion Collection

2000 films
2000 drama films
Ethnofiction films
Films about heroin addiction
Films about immigration
Films about race and ethnicity
Films directed by Pedro Costa
Portuguese drama films
2000s Portuguese-language films
Films shot in Portugal